Primulin is an anthocyanin. It is the 3-galactoside of malvidin. It can be found in Primula sinensis.

The first crystalline form of this pigment was prepared by Rose Scott-Moncrieff in about 1930. This was the first crystalline anthrocyanine pigment ever identified. This was possible because of her insight into linking genetics with chemistry.

References 

O-methylated anthocyanins
Flavonoid galactosides